XHETA-FM is a radio station on 107.1 FM in Zitácuaro, Michoacán. It is owned by Radio Zitácuaro, S.A. and known as Cuadrante Digital.

History
XETA-AM received its concession on March 2, 1950. It broadcast on 1080 kHz and was owned by Manuel Estéban Polos. Control transferred to Pichir Estéban Polos in the 1960s and XETA began broadcasting with 500 watts on 600 kHz.

In the 1990s, XETA increased power to 1,000 watts. It was approved to migrate to FM in 2011.

Until early 2016, it was known as Solo Hits.

External links
Cuadrante Digital Facebook

References

Radio stations in Michoacán